Gibellina is a genus of fungi in the family Magnaporthaceae, from Italy.

The genus name of Gibellia is in honour of Giuseppe Gibelli (1831 – 1898), who was an Italian botanist and lichenologist who was a native of Santa Cristina e Bissone.

The genus was circumscribed by Giovanni Passerini in Revue Mycol. Toulouse Vol.8 on page 177 in 1886.

References

Sordariomycetes genera
Magnaporthales